Lac Etchemin Airport  is located adjacent to Lac-Etchemin, Quebec, Canada.

References

Registered aerodromes in Chaudière-Appalaches